Chub is a common name for some types of fish. It also refers to a certain species, usually called "chub": Squalius cephalus.

Chub also may refer to:

Places
 Chub, Texas, community in the United States
 Chub Creek, a stream in Minnesota
 Chub Lake (disambiguation)

Other uses
 Chub (container)
 HMS Chub, name of three ships of the Royal Navy
 Chub, chubbing, a legislative discussion among several members to waste time and/or block action. See filibuster.
 Chub (gay slang), large, overweight, or obese man in the gay community
 Chub (haircut), traditional Ukrainian Cossack haircut
 CHUB-FM, a radio station licensed to Red Deer, Alberta, Canada
 CKWV-FM, a radio station in Nanaimo, British Columbia, Canada, which held the call sign CHUB from 1949 to 1995

See also
Chubb (disambiguation)